Tristemma may refer to:
 Tristemma (plant), a genus of flowering plants in the family Melastomataceae
 Tristemma, a genus of mollusks in the family Holospiridae; synonym of Holospira